The 1983 Winston 500 was a NASCAR Winston Cup Series event that took place on  May 1, 1983, at Alabama International Motor Speedway (now Talladega Superspeedway) in Talladega, Alabama.

Background
Talladega Superspeedway, originally known as Alabama International Motor Superspeedway (AIMS), is a motorsports complex located north of Talladega, Alabama. It is located on the former Anniston Air Force Base in the small city of Lincoln. The track is a Tri-oval and was constructed by International Speedway Corporation, a business controlled by the France Family, in the 1960s. Talladega is most known for its steep banking and the unique location of the start/finish line - located just past the exit to pit road. The track currently hosts the NASCAR series such as the Monster Energy Cup Series, Xfinity Series, and the Camping World Truck Series.

Qualifying

Qualifying results

Race
There were 42 American-born drivers on the grid, representing manufacturers Pontiac, Buick, Chevrolet, and Ford. Richard Petty defeated Benny Parsons by two car lengths after three hours and fourteen minutes to earn his 197th career win. Seven cautions for 42 laps were witnessed by 110,000 spectators in addition to 27 lead changes. There was a major incident involving Phil Parsons and ten other drivers. Two photographers managed to get Parsons out of the wreck. The entire race purse was $361,820 ($ when adjusted for inflation).

Harry Gant finished 4th and took the points lead from Bobby Allison as a result of the 31-point swing. Neil Bonnett came in third in points and maintained that position although he lost ground as a result of the issues that left him with a 15th-place finish, seven laps down.

Dale Earnhardt was driving a Ford Thunderbird for team owner Bud Moore this year. Lowell Cowell would retire from NASCAR after this race.

Race results

Race summary
 Lead changes: 27 among different drivers
 Cautions/Laps: 7 for 43
 Red flags: 0    
 Time of race: 3 hours, 14 minutes and 55 seconds
 Average speed:

Media

Television
The television coverage of this race was (on NBC) on a tape-delayed broadcast.

Radio

Standings after the race

Drivers' Championship standings

Manufacturers' Championship standings

Note: Only the first 10 positions are included for the driver standings.

References

Winston 500
Winston 500
NASCAR races at Talladega Superspeedway